Sholayur or Sholayar may refer to

 Sholayur, a village in Palakkad district, state of Kerala, India
 Sholayar (gram panchayat), a gram panchayat serving the above village and others